Winter Island is an island in Massachusetts, United States, on the U.S. National Register of Historic Places. It may also refer to:

Antarctica
 Winter Island (Antarctica)

Canada
 Winter Island (Kitikmeot)
 Winter Island (Qikiqtaaluk)

United States
 Winter Island (California)